Henry Lorette Ward (born January 30, 1952) is an American former professional basketball player. He played for the San Antonio Spurs in 1975–76 while they were in the American Basketball Association and then the following season when they had moved to the National Basketball Association. Ward then played for Olimpia Cagliari in Italy during the 1977–78 season.

References

1952 births
Living people
American expatriate basketball people in Italy
Basketball players from Jackson, Mississippi
Cleveland Cavaliers draft picks
Jackson State Tigers basketball players
San Antonio Spurs players
Shooting guards
American men's basketball players